Desert Thieves is a 1914 American short silent Western film directed by Scott Sidney and featuring Charles Ray, Gretchen Lederer, Tsuru Aoki, Frank Keenan and Ernest Swallow in lead roles.

Cast
 Charles Ray
 Gretchen Lederer
 Tsuru Aoki
 Frank Keenan
 Ernest Swallow

References

External links
 

1914 films
1914 Western (genre) films
American silent short films
American black-and-white films
Films directed by Scott Sidney
Silent American Western (genre) films
1910s American films